In Greek mythology, Zoeteus (Ancient Greek: Ζοιτεύς) was a member of the Arcadian royal family, as the son of Prince Tricolonus, son of the impious King Lycaon. He was the elder brother of Paroreus. Zoeteus was the reputed founder of Zoetia, a town in Arcadia.

Notes

References 

 Pausanias, Description of Greece with an English Translation by W.H.S. Jones, Litt.D., and H.A. Ormerod, M.A., in 4 Volumes. Cambridge, MA, Harvard University Press; London, William Heinemann Ltd. 1918. . Online version at the Perseus Digital Library
 Pausanias, Graeciae Descriptio. 3 vols. Leipzig, Teubner. 1903. Greek text available at the Perseus Digital Library.
 Stephanus of Byzantium, Stephani Byzantii Ethnicorum quae supersunt, edited by August Meineike (1790-1870), published 1849. A few entries from this important ancient handbook of place names have been translated by Brady Kiesling. Online version at the Topos Text Project.

Arcadian characters in Greek mythology
Arcadian mythology